Festival of fantasy may refer to:
Festival fantazie, a science fiction and fantasy convention held in the Czech Republic
Festival of Fantasy Parade,  the current daytime parade at the Magic Kingdom at the Walt Disney World Resort